Stanley Stanford Schumacher  (12 June 1933 – 10 October 2020) was a politician from Alberta, Canada.  He was speaker of the Legislative Assembly of Alberta and a member of the House of Commons of Canada.

Early life
Stanley Stanford Schumacher was born in Hanna, Alberta to parents Louis and Gladys Schumacher on 12 June 1933. Louis Schumacher was a businessman and his mother Gladys was a school teacher. In 1968, he married Virginia Brodie whom he met in the Young Progressive Conservative Club, with whom he had two children, Sandra and David.

Schumacher joined the Canadian Officers' Training Corps in fall 1954 and served until 1958 as a commissioned second lieutenant in the Royal Canadian Armoured Corps, including a deployment to Soest, Germany with the Royal Canadian Dragoons. Schumacher's military service ended in March 1962.
 
He attended school in Dorothy and Drumheller, Alberta, and went on to the University of British Columbia, where he received his Bachelor of Commerce in 1958 and Bachelor of Laws in 1959.  He returned to Drumheller where he practised law.

Federal political career
Schumacher first ran for the Progressive Conservative Party of Canada in the 1968 federal election, and was elected to represent Palliser in Alberta.  He served three terms in the House of Commons. During this time Schumacher chaired the Alberta Progressive Conservative caucus and was the secretary of the national caucus for one year.

As a result of redistribution before the 1979 federal election, the district of Palliser was abolished. Schumacher intended to seek his party's nomination in the new riding of Bow River, which included much of his old district, but was asked by party officials to step aside in favour of leader Joe Clark, whose own riding of Rocky Mountain had also been abolished. Although Tory officials offered him the nomination in another riding, Schumacher refused to stand down, forcing Clark to run in Yellowhead. In Bow River, Schumacher was challenged for the nomination by former Socred Gordon Taylor and lost in a controversial meeting in which Schumacher's supporters alleged that people who were not bona fide members of the party voted. Schumacher's former assistant, John Aimers, resigned from the party in January 1978 in protest, accusing the national executive of engineering Schumacher's defeat.

On 28 February 1978 Schumacher left the party and sat as an independent.  In the election the following year, he ran in Bow River against Taylor and was defeated.

Provincial political career

In the 1986 Alberta general election Schumacher ran for the Progressive Conservative Association of Alberta in Drumheller.  He was elected and was soon appointed Deputy Speaker, a position he held until 1993.  Schumacher was reelected in the 1989 and 1993 general elections. He became the first elected Speaker of the Legislative Assembly after the retirement of David Carter, defeating Liberal candidate Bettie Hewes. As speaker, Schumacher never named a member and instead employed short adjournments for the purpose of restoring order. He retired from the Assembly after dissolution in 1997.

Late life
After his career in the provincial legislature he formed the Drumheller law firm Schumacher, Gough and Pedersen, and served on the Alberta Surface Rights and Land Compensation boards where he eventually became Chairman in 2001.

In November 2012, Schumacher received the Queen Elizabeth II Diamond Jubilee Medal in recognition for his public service contributions to Albertans and Canadians over the past more than 45 years.  Earlier he had received the Silver and Golden Jubilee Medals.

Schumacher died 10 October 2020, aged 87, from complications of dementia.

References

Further reading

External links
 

1933 births
2020 deaths
Speakers of the Legislative Assembly of Alberta
UBC Sauder School of Business alumni
Members of the House of Commons of Canada from Alberta
Progressive Conservative Party of Canada MPs
Progressive Conservative Association of Alberta MLAs
Independent MPs in the Canadian House of Commons
People from Drumheller
Peter A. Allard School of Law alumni
Royal Canadian Dragoons officers